Monster Squad is a television series produced by D'Angelo-Bullock-Allen Productions that aired Saturday mornings on NBC from September 11, 1976, to September 3, 1977. It is unrelated to the later film of the same name.

Premise
The series stars Fred Grandy (who also starred in The Love Boat and was later elected to the United States House of Representatives) as Walt, a criminology student working as a night watchman at "Fred's Wax Museum". To pass the time, Walt built a prototype "Crime Computer" hidden in a large stone sarcophagus near an exhibit of legendary monsters. When Walt plugged in his computer, "oscillating vibrations" brought to life the wax statues of Dracula (Henry Polic II), the Wolfman (Buck Kartalian) who here was named "Bruce W. Wolf" (with one episode revealing that the "W" stood for "Were"), and the Frankenstein Monster (Michael Lane) who was referred to as "Frank N. Stein" in the credits.

The monsters, wanting to make up for the misdeeds of their pasts, became superhero crimefighters who used their unique abilities to challenge and defeat various supervillains. In most episodes, Walt would send the monsters out to investigate crimes and fight the villains while monitoring the activities from the wax museum via the Crime Computer, presumably because his job required him to be at the wax museum at all times. However, Walt would sometimes join the climactic battle with his comrades in some episodes and come to the rescue when needed.

Though the Squad are supposed to be wax statues, it often appears that they are something else entirely, as they apparently have all the memories of the monsters they are based on as well as their powers. The gentle giant Frank, for example, possessed superhuman strength and could smash through walls, while the dapper cloak-clad and fearsome-fanged Drac could turn into a bat, and the short and furry Bruce was a ferocious fighter who could climb up the sheer sides of buildings Spider-Man-style and had a super-sensitive sense of smell.

The Squad had their own customized black Monster Van, and each monster had a "utility belt" with a communicator device used to keep in touch with Walt, who had apparently created them for the monsters to use. Their CB-style codenames were "Chamber of Horrors" (Walt), "Nightflyer" (Drac), "Green Machine" (Frank) and "Furball" (Bruce).

The show was comparable to the 1960s Batman TV show, not surprising considering that creator Stanley Ralph Ross had been one of the main writers on that series. The villains were often exaggerated camp super-villains much like the ones on Batman in keeping with the "superhero" tone of the show, and were often played by familiar-faced guest stars of the time, like Alice Ghostley ("Queen Bee"), Marty Allen ("Lorenzo Musica"), Jonathan Harris ("the Astrologer"), Julie Newmar ("Ultra Witch"), Avery Schreiber ("the Weatherman") and Vito Scotti ("Albert/Alberta").

In several episodes, a statue of the Invisible Man can be seen in an alcove on the opposite side of the monsters' exhibit. It is never explained why this statue remains unaffected by the Crime Computer's oscillating vibrations.

Cast

Main 
 Fred Grandy – Walt
 Henry Polic II –  Dracula
 Buck Kartalian – Bruce W. Wolf
 Michael Lane – Frank N. Stein

Recurring
 Mayor Goldwyn: (portrayed by Edward Andrews)
 Officer McMacMac: (portrayed by Paul Smith and Richard X. Slattery)

Others
 Jackie Joey: (portrayed by Stanley Ralph Ross)
 Chief Running Nose: (portrayed by Sid Haig)
 Mimi Falters: (portrayed by Caren Kaye)
 Farmer: (portrayed by Frank Cady)
 Dandy Andy: (portrayed by Johnny Brown)
 King Fooey: (portrayed by Nathan Jung)
 Store Manager: (portrayed by Patrick Campbell)
 Newscaster: (portrayed by Mike Lawrence)
 Dr. Fishline: (portrayed by John Alvin)

Villains
 Queen Bee: (portrayed by Alice Ghostley) – A bee-themed villainess who controls a swarm of killer bees
 Spelling Bee and Bumble Bee: (portrayed by Hamilton Camp and Al Mancini) – Queen Bee's henchmen
 Mr. Mephisto: (portrayed by Barry Dennen) – Creator of life-sized living dolls
 Baby Doll and Arlene Doll: (portrayed by Cathy Worthington and Mindi Miller) – Mr. Mephisto's hypnotic-eyed henchwomen
 The Tickler: (portrayed by Ivor Francis) – Sad-faced clown/criminal mastermind
 Twitter and Snicker: (portrayed by Al Stellone and Doug Stevenson) – The Tickler's henchmen
 The Ringmaster: (portrayed by Billy Curtis) – Diminutive circus owner who holds an audience of children hostage as revenge against those who made fun of his size
 Sam Strongman and Bonnie Bon: (portrayed by H.B. Haggerty and Simone Griffeth) – The Ringmaster's henchmen
 Lorenzo Musica: (portrayed by Marty Allen) – A failed musician who robs a telethon so he can pay people to attend his concert
 Andante and Allegro: (portrayed by Tom Sherohman and Michael McManus) – Lorenzo Musica's henchmen
 No Face: (portrayed by Sid Haig and Edward Andrews, although his actual voice was supplied by an uncredited third actor) – A literally faceless master of disguise 
 Pillage and Plunder: (portrayed by Timothy Scott and David Proval) – No Face's henchmen
 The Astrologer: (portrayed by Jonathan Harris) – A TV prognosticator planning to use an atomic bomb to make his prediction of an earthquake come true
 Castor and Pollux: (portrayed by Sandy McPeak and James Gammon) – The Astrologer's henchmen
 Ultra Witch: (portrayed by Julie Newmar) – A sexy sorceress who has made all the world's milk turn sour
 Toil and Trouble: (portrayed by Richard Bakalyan and Joe E. Tata) – Ultra Witch's henchmen
 The Wizard: (portrayed by Arthur Malet) – A Merlin-like magician miniaturizing monuments
 Mumbo and Jumbo: (portrayed by Victor Paul and Mickey Morton) – The Wizard's henchmen
 The Skull: (portrayed by Geoffrey Lewis) – A sinister scientist who revives a mummy as the first step in his plan to create an army of the evil dead
 Blue Tooth and The Mummy: (portrayed by Peter Zapp and Pete Kellett) – The Skull's henchmen
 The Weatherman: (portrayed by Avery Schreiber) – A would-be dictator causing blizzards in July
 Phoebe Snow and David Frost: (portrayed by Cheryl Miller and Owen Orr) – The Weatherman's henchmen
 Lawrence of Moravia: (portrayed by Joseph Mascolo) – Arabian billionaire who steals for fun rather than profit
 Fouad and Abdul: (portrayed by Winston Roberts and Joe Tornatore) – Lawrence of Moravia's henchmen
 Night Watchman: (portrayed by Whitney Rydbeck) – Lawrence of Moravia's henchman
 Albert/Alberta: (portrayed by Vito Scotti) – A sideshow-style half-and-half hermaphrodite using a laser to melt the polar icecap
 Half-Wit and Half-Nelson: (portrayed by Raymond Singer and Phil Diskin) – Albert/Alberta's henchmen

Episodes

Home video
Monster Squad: The Complete Series was released in Region 1 on June 23, 2009, by Virgil Films and Entertainment. The Region 2 release followed on August 3, 2009, by Fabulous Films.

In popular culture 
A later, unrelated animated television series by Hanna-Barbera Productions called Drak Pack had a similar premise, as did the DC Comics characters the Creature Commandos, although they fought Nazis rather that super-criminals.

In Teen Titans Go! episode 8, "Monster Squad", the Titans want to be the scariest trick-or-treaters in town, so Raven casts a spell to turn them into real monsters.

References 

 Jones, Stephen, ed. The Illustrated Werewolf Movie Guide. London: Titan Books, 1996, p. 137.

External links 
 
 Monster Squad – Pilot episode in-depth review with screenshots
 TV Shows on DVD news

NBC original programming
1976 American television series debuts
1977 American television series endings
1970s American children's television series
1970s American horror television series
Vampires in television
Television about werewolves
American children's horror television series
Works based on Frankenstein
Batman (TV series)